Jennings is an unincorporated community located in the town of Schoepke, Oneida County, Wisconsin, United States. Mecikalski General Store, Saloon, and Boarding House, which is listed on the National Register of Historic Places, is located in Jennings.

References

Unincorporated communities in Oneida County, Wisconsin
Unincorporated communities in Wisconsin